Mona Anderson  (11 March 1909 – 3 May 2004) was a New Zealand writer. She is best known for her first book, A River Rules My Life, published in 1963. In Pacific Affairs in 1963–64, American J. B. Condliffe described it as "an immediate best-seller in New Zealand", while in 2017 a Christchurch City librarian wrote that its reissue was "a cornerstone of New Zealand back country life".

Anderson was appointed a Member of the Order of the British Empire in the 1980 New Year Honours for "services to literature".

Works 

 A River Rules My Life (1963)
 The Good Logs of Algidus (1965)
 Over the River (1966)
 A Wonderful World At My Doorstep (1968)
 A Letter From James (1972)
 Mary-Lou: The story of a high country lamb (1975)
 The Water Joey (1976)
 Old Duke: The story of a hard-case horse (1977)
 Home Is the High Country: My animal friends (1979)
Both Sides of the River (1981)

References

External links 
 Harry Broad's review of the 2017 reissue of A River Rules My Life
 Video about Mount Algidus station, including Mona Anderson

1909 births
2004 deaths
20th-century New Zealand women writers
New Zealand memoirists
New Zealand Members of the Order of the British Empire
People from North Canterbury